Mickey Mouse Funhouse is an American computer-animated preschool television series created by Phil Weinstein and Thomas Hart and is the successor to Mickey Mouse Clubhouse and Mickey Mouse Mixed-Up Adventures. The series debuted with a special on July 16, 2021, and was followed by the official premiere on Disney Junior on August 20. In October 2021, the series was renewed for a second season which premiered on November 4, 2022. In June 2022, the series was renewed for a third season.

Disney Junior created the series to continue its pattern of original pre-school animated series set within the Mickey Mouse universe. Many key members of the creative team of Mickey Mouse Clubhouse and Mickey Mouse Mixed-Up Adventures developed the series.

Plot
Mickey Mouse returns with his friends Minnie Mouse, Donald Duck, Daisy Duck, Goofy and Pluto. The friends meet Funny, an enchanted, talking, and energetic playhouse residing in the Funhouse Forest outside of Hot Dog Hills alongside his pet doghouse Teddy and a sentient weathervane named Windy. After Mickey and his friends climb the stairs, Funny magically transports the group of friends from the Adventure Doors to a range of destinations which allows them to embark on adventures unique to those lands like Majestica, Sunny Side Gulch, the Adventure Sea Islands, the Land of Myths and Legends, and Herotropolis. It is in these worlds where they also meet it's inhabitants and alter-egos of characters they know. Funny can also change his shape and appearance to match the new surroundings, and can even project his face on any surface to speak with Mickey and friends.

Characters

Main
 Bret Iwan as Mickey Mouse and Martian Mickey
 Kaitlyn Robrock as Minnie Mouse, Martian Minnie, Cosmo Cockroach, Rosie and Shivery Timbers
 Tony Anselmo as Donald Duck
 Tress MacNeille as Daisy Duck and Chip (Season 1)
 Debra Wilson as Daisy Duck (Season 2–present)
 Bill Farmer as Goofy, Pluto, Horace Horsecollar and Mayor McBeagle
 Harvey Guillén as Funny
 Jim Cummings as Pete
 Corey Burton as Ludwig Von Drake and Dale
 April Winchell as Clarabelle Cow and Hilda
 Nika Futterman as Cuckoo Loca
 Jan Johns as Windy the Weathervane, Farfus the Dragon, Goldie the Goldfish, Sunny, Seabiscuit & Bubbles, Mamie Chickie Boo Boo, Chip (Season 2–present) and Cream Puff 
 Brock Powell as Teddy the Doghouse, Sneezel, Lefty, Magic Mirror, Shepherd Sam, Hal, Toad, Willie the Giant (Season 2–present) and One Eye'd Jack

Recurring
 Dee Bradley Baker as Yeti and T-Top the Triceratops
 Frank Welker as Figaro
 Daniel Ross as Zoop Bloop and Fred
 Richard Kind as Cheezel
 Jenifer Lewis as Wheezelene
 Rogelio Douglas Jr. as Royal Troubadour
 Kayvan Novak as Trolland the Troll
 Mickey Guyton as Wanda Warbler
 Will Ryan as Willie the Giant (Season 1–2)
 Maurice LaMarche as Mortimer Mouse
 Sivan Alyra Rose as Crystal Clearwater
 Jaime Camil as Rocket Mouse
 Sonal Shah as Jinn
 Amanda Seales as Annie the Giant
 Roz Ryan as Thalia
 Lillias White as Calliope
 John Stamos as Captain Salty Bones
 Jorjeana Marie as Trikini

Guest appearances
 Kate Micucci as Cora
 Alice Lee as Ye Eun
 Artt Butler as Saiya
 Lois Chimimba as the Tooth Fairy
 Yvette Nicole Brown as Pepper Lemon
 Yasmine Al Massri as Bast
 Jee Young Han as Cho Sook

Episodes

Series overview

Season 1 (2021–22)
<onlyinclude>

Season 2 (2022–23)
<onlyinclude>

Production

Development
Mickey Mouse Funhouse begun production in 2020, a new animated series which was to premiere on the network Disney Junior in 2021. Produced by Disney Television Animation, the series was developed by executive producer Phil Weinstein, as well as co-executive producer Thomas Hart, and story editor Mark Drop, who had previously worked on Mickey Mouse Mixed-Up Adventures as part of the creative team. The new series introduced an additional character, Funny. Each episode of the series features two 11-minute stories separated by a regular "dance break" interlude. On October 19, 2021, Disney Junior renewed the series for a second season. On June 15, 2022, Disney Junior renewed the series for a third season.

Casting
The main cast from the previous show, including Bret Iwan, Bill Farmer, Kaitlyn Robrock (replacing Russi Taylor due to her death in 2019), Tress MacNeille and Tony Anselmo (replacing Daniel Ross after being replaced himself in Mixed-Up Adventures), return. Joining them is Harvey Guillén, voicing the character Funny, an enchanted talking playhouse, among others. This show notably marked the last time that Will Ryan voiced Willie the Giant before his death in November 2021. In 2023, Willie the Giant is now voiced by Brock Powell. In 2022, Debra Wilson and Jan Johns replaced Tress MacNeille as the voice of Daisy and Chip respectively, due to MacNeille becoming occupied with other projects.

Animation
Alan Bodner, who worked on Rapunzel's Tangled Adventure, serves as the series' art director. For his direction of "Mickey the Brave!", Bodner stated that he drew inspiration from The Mickey Mouse Club, recalling the colourful and imaginative sets. The animation was also influenced by the colourful and fantastical artwork featured in Alice in Wonderland.

Release
Mickey Mouse Funhouse premiered with a prime time special entitled "Mickey the Brave!" on July 16, 2021 on Disney Junior. This episode was released on Disney+ on July 23. It was also released on September 30, 2021, in Southeast Asia, but only lasted a day prior to the shutdown of the channel on October 1, 2021.In Vietnam, after Q.net television recreated the animation structure, It was released on 1 October, 2021 on SKTV Kids at 18:00 p.m.

The full series premiered on August 20, 2021 with a simulcast on Disney Junior and Disney Channel. The series was released on Disney+ on November 10, 2021.

A prime time special entitled "Pirate Adventure" premiered on August 19, 2022 with a simulcast on Disney Junior and Disney Channel.

The second season of the series premiered on November 4, 2022, with a simulcast on Disney Junior and Disney Channel, later on Disney+ in early 2023.

Reception

Critical reception
Joly Herman of Common Sense Media rated the television series 3 out of 5 stars, complimented the presence of educational value and positive messages, citing creativity and social-emotional lessons dealing with friendship, while saying the show manages to be entertaining.

Notes

References

External links
 
 

2020s American animated television series
2020s American children's television series
2020s preschool education television series
2021 American television series debuts
American children's animated adventure television series
American computer-animated television series
American preschool education television series
Animated television series reboots
Disney Junior original programming
Television series by Disney Television Animation
Animated preschool education television series
English-language television shows